Saravah is a French jazz record label founded by singer-songwriter Pierre Barouh in 1965.

Saravah released the album 50 Years to celebrate its anniversary in the music business. The album included Albin de la Simone, Bastien Lallemant, Bertrand Belin, Camélia Jordana, François Morel, Jeanne Cherhal, Kahimi Karie, Maïa Barouh, Nana Vasconcelos, Olivia Ruiz, Ringo Sheena, Séverin, and Yolande Moreau.

Saravah owns and operates a concert hall in Shibuya, Tokyo. Opened in 2011, Saravah Tokyo (サラヴァ東京) is a "cultural meeting place where you can enjoy music without borders."

Roster
Artists who have released albums on Saravah include
 A Filetta
 Areski Belkacem
 Art Ensemble of Chicago
 Barney Wilen
 Bïa Krieger
 Brigitte Fontaine
 Georges Arvanitas
 Jacques Higelin
 Jean-Roger Caussimon
 Maurane
 Michel Graillier
 Pierre Akendengué
 Pierre Barouh
 Pierre Louki
 René Urtreger
 Steve Lacy
 Thollem McDonas

See also
 List of record labels

References

French record labels
Record labels established in 1965
Jazz record labels
Folk record labels